Say Anything may refer to:

Film and television
 Say Anything..., a 1989 American film by Cameron Crowe
 "Say Anything" (BoJack Horseman), a television episode

Music
 Say Anything (band), an American rock band
 Say Anything (album), a 2009 album by the band
 "Say Anything", a 2012 song by Say Anything from Anarchy, My Dear
 "Say Anything" (Marianas Trench song), 2006
 "Say Anything" (X Japan song), 1991
 "Say Anything", a song by Aimee Mann from Whatever, 1993
 "Say Anything", a song by the Bouncing Souls from The Bouncing Souls, 1997
 "Say Anything", a song by Good Charlotte from The Young and the Hopeless, 2002
 "Say Anything", a song by Girl in Red, 2018
 "Say Anything", a song by Marianas Trench from Fix Me, 2006
 "Say Anything", a song by Will Young from Lexicon, 2019
 "Say Anything (Else)", a song by Cartel from Chroma, 2005

Other uses
 Say Anything (party game), a 2008 board game published by North Star Games
 "Say Anything", a column in YM magazine

See also
 Say Something (disambiguation)